Apamea lintneri, the sand wainscot moth, is a species of moth native to North America. It is listed as a species of special concern in the US state of Connecticut. The species was described by Augustus Radcliffe Grote in 1873.

References

lintneri
Moths of North America
Moths described in 1873
Taxa named by Augustus Radcliffe Grote